Arseh Dowgah (also Romanized as ‘Arşeh Dowgāh; also known as Arsadiga, Arsadya, Arseh Dījeh, and ‘Arşeh Dogāh) is a village in Sanjabad-e Gharbi Rural District, in the Central District of Kowsar County, Ardabil Province, Iran. At the 2006 census, its population was 212, in 39 families.

References 

Towns and villages in Kowsar County